Gahuku Rural LLG is a local-level government (LLG) of Eastern Highlands Province, Papua New Guinea. The Alekano language, also known as Gahuku, is spoken in the LLG.

Wards
01. Upper Yaukave
02. Lower Yaukave
03. Kami-Seigu
04. Kama
05. Fimito
06. Kotuni
07. Gahuku
08. Gehamo

References

Local-level governments of Eastern Highlands Province